The Big South Conference men's basketball tournament (popularly known as the Big South tournament) is the conference championship tournament in basketball for the Big South Conference. The tournament has been held every year since 1986. It is a single-elimination tournament and seeding is based on regular season records. The winner, declared conference champion, receives the conference's automatic bid to the NCAA men's basketball tournament. However, the conference did not have an automatic bid to the NCAA tournament from 1986 to 1990, and in 1995.

Before the 1994-95 season, Campbell departed the Big South due to scheduling conflicts. This left the conference with just five teams having played at the Division I level for at least five years, short of the six such members required by the NCAA for a conference to receive an automatic bid into the NCAA tournament. As a result, the Big South did not have an automatic qualifier to the 1995 NCAA tournament, its first time without an auto-bid since 1990; it regained an auto-bid in 1996 and has maintained an auto-bid in every year since, as of 2021.

From 2003 through 2012, the tournament was held mostly at campus sites. In 2003, the semifinals and finals were held at a predetermined site. After that, depending on the year, either the final, or both the semifinals and final, were hosted by the team that won the regular-season title. In 2012, the regular-season champion hosted the quarterfinals as well. Starting in 2013, the tournament was held at a single site for the first time since 2002, specifically Coastal Carolina's new HTC Center (known at the time of announcement as the Student Recreation and Convocation Center).  The tournament remained at that venue until Coastal announced its 2016 departure for the Sun Belt Conference; the 2016 edition was held at the Pope Convocation Center on the campus of Campbell University. Beginning in 2017, the format changed yet again; the first round is now held at campus sites, with the quarterfinals and semifinals hosted by the regular-season winner and the final by the top surviving seed.



Results

Performance By School

Notes

See also
 Big South Conference women's basketball tournament

References

 

 
Recurring sporting events established in 1986